Rupp's mouse or Rupp's stenocephalemys (Stenocephalemys ruppi) is a species of rodent in the family Muridae.
It is found only in Ethiopia.
Its natural habitat is subtropical or tropical high-altitude shrubland.
It is threatened by habitat loss.

References

Stenocephalemys
Mammals of Ethiopia
Mammals described in 1983
Taxonomy articles created by Polbot
Endemic fauna of Ethiopia